Lakshmi Rajagopalan (born 12 March 1959) is a leading Carnatic vocalist in India.

Early life and background

Lakshmi was born in Matunga, a suburb in Mumbai, to Mrs. Radha and Mr. T. V. Panchapakesan. She has four sisters who have also been honed in music. She started learning music at the age of 3 from her mother and was equally well supported by her father. She did her graduation in Commerce from Mumbai University and C.A.I.I.B. from Indian Institute of Bankers. She completed a 5-year music course at Bharatiya Music & Fine Arts, in Mumbai. Later she underwent 2 years of advanced and rigorous training in Raagam, Thanam and Pallavi under the tutelage of Smt T.R. Balamani.

At the tender age, she won a major competition and awarded a prize at the age of eight from Bharat Ratna M. S. Subbulakshmi.

She was in managerial cadre with Bank of Baroda and took VRS to pursue her career in Carnatic Music.

Singing Style
Lakshmi does not keep any notes or hints during the Kacheri which reveal the depth in Carnatic knowledge. Her voice is majestic and soothing. Her singing style follows the traditions of legendary Carnatic singers such as Semmangudi mama, MS, DKP to name a few.

Performances

Smt. Lakshmi Rajagopalan has sung in various popular stages and in many TV channels including Jaya TV, Amrita TV, Sri Shankara, SVBC, DD Podhigai and Asianet. She has performed in All India Radio & Doordarshan Kendra as an ‘A’ Grade Artist. She has already performed twice in national program in AIR and Doordarshan. Being residing in Navi Mumbai she regularly performs in almost all popular sabha's in Mumbai and other states in India and abroad. She has also conducted lecture cum demonstrations in Mumbai at Shivali Cultural Society, Kalamanjari and at Navarasa Music Academy.

Her voice lends itself well to the Indian Carnatic classical songs. She has sung in more than seven languages including Tamil, Hindi, Malayalam, Kannada, Telugu, Marathi and Sanskrit through her long career in music. She encourages several young and budding students who often accompany her as supporting artists in Mrudangam, Kangira, and Thavil.

Awards and recognition
Lakshmi has won several gold medals and also the prestigious Tambura prize in various competitions conducted by Music Academy, Indian Fine Arts Society, Chennai, Sri Shanmukhananda Fine Arts Mumbai and other Sabhas.

She has participated in All India Inter Bank Music competition and has always won the first prize and the rolling trophy.

Some notable awards include,

Tabla ThathaChari Award in Chennai
Maharajapuram Vishvanatha Iyer award for a senior musician.

Dr. A. P. J. Abdul Kalam International Excellence award from Dubai.

Vocational Excellence Award from Rotary Club of Navi Mumbai

Titles
She has been conferred the title of “Asthana Vidhushi” & awarded the title of “Sangeeta Visharada” by Sri Sri Jagadguru Sankaracharya of Badari Sakatapuram Sreevidya Peetam.

She also has been conferred of “Sangeeta Sevamani” by Sri Sri Jagadguru Jayendra Saraswathi of Kanchi kamakoti Peetam.

She has also been conferred the title of “Asthana Vidushi” by Sri Sri Jagadguru Vanamamalai Jeeyar Swamigal, Nanguneri.

She has also been conferred the title of “Sangeetha Kovidha” from Gayathri Fine Arts, New Delhi.

She has also been conferred the title of “Sangeetha Bhushana” by Sriranjani Sangeetha Sabha, Mumbai.

She has also been conferred the title of “Guru Seva Rathna” from Anushathin Anugraham at the hands of Mr. Indira Soundar Rajan.

Audio Releases
To her credit, she has released several following audio CD.

1. Bakthi Manjari three Volumes 1,2,3.

2. Kanchi Sankara

3. Devi Saranam

4. Carnatic Classical

Press releases
Her concerts are highly rated and many positive reviews have been published. Some of them are listed here.

1. DNA-navi Mumbai : 20 November 2007
Keertananjali's Carnatic treat enthralls audience

2. NEW BOMBAY −23. 11.2007
Bombay Lakshmi Rajagopalan's Diwali Musical Fireworks

3. THE HINDU 12 January 2007
Casting a magic spell

4. DNA – Navi Mumbai 20 May 2006

5. IN NEW BOMBAY 20 to 26 May 2006
Stalwart Smt.LakshmiRajagopalan's Magnificent Concert

6. THE HINDU, New Delhi
QUALITY MUSIC

7. The Indian Express, New Delhi
Singing from the heart

8. THE INDIAN POST, KOLKATA
Good song selection

9. THE INDIAN POST, KOLKATA
Great Singer

10. FREE PRESS JOURNAL
Melody & mime

11. THE INDIAN EXPRESS, MUMBAI
Pleasing Concert

12. THE HINDU – 30 May 2008
Music that marks a puritan

References

1959 births
Women Carnatic singers
Carnatic singers
Living people
Singers from Mumbai
Women musicians from Maharashtra
Indian women classical singers
21st-century Indian singers
21st-century Indian women singers
20th-century Indian women singers
20th-century Indian singers